Tifrah is a religious moshav in southern Israel. Located in the north-western Negev to the west of Eshel HaNasi with an area of 5,000 dunams, it falls under the jurisdiction of Merhavim Regional Council.

History
The moshav was established in 1950 by Jewish immigrants from Hungary and North Africa. Like the names of two other moshavim (Gilat, Ranen) in the area, its name is taken from the Book of Isaiah 35:2;
(The wilderness and the parched land, (35:1)) 
it shall blossom abundantly, and rejoice, even with joy and singing.

References

Moshavim
Religious Israeli communities
Populated places established in 1950
Populated places in Southern District (Israel)
1950 establishments in Israel
Hungarian-Jewish culture in Israel
North African-Jewish culture in Israel